Kevin Robert Quackenbush (born November 28, 1988) is an American professional baseball pitcher who is a free agent. He has previously played in Major League Baseball (MLB) for the San Diego Padres, Cincinnati Reds, and Los Angeles Dodgers.

Career
Quackenbush attended Jesuit High School in Tampa, Florida, and the University of South Florida, where he played college baseball for the South Florida Bulls baseball team as their closer. Quackenbush was named a second team All-American in 2011.

San Diego Padres
The Padres selected him in the eighth round of the 2011 MLB Draft. In his first season with the organization, he split his playing time between the Class A short-season Eugene Emeralds and Class A Fort Wayne TinCaps. The Padres promoted Quackenbush to Class AAA in 2013 and invited him to spring training in 2014.

Quackenbush was called up to the majors for the first time on April 25, 2014, and made his debut that day. The following month, he picked up his first major league win. On August 19, he recorded his first major league save.

On September 1, 2017, he was designated for assignment. On September 6, he cleared waivers, and San Diego outrighted him to El Paso.  He became a free agent following the season.

In 2017 with the Padres, he was 0-2 with a 7.86 ERA in 20 games.

Cincinnati Reds
On November 8, 2017, Quackenbush signed a minor league deal with the Cincinnati Reds organization. He had his contract purchased on March 28, 2018. He was designated for assignment on April 24, 2018. He declared free agency on October 3, 2018.

Los Angeles Dodgers
On November 13, 2018, Quackenbush signed a minor league deal with the Los Angeles Dodgers. He was assigned to the AAA Oklahoma City Dodgers and was selected to the Pacific Coast League team at the Triple-A All-Star Game. On November 4, 2019, Quackenbush elected free agency.

Washington Nationals
On January 27, 2020, Quackenbush signed a minor league deal with the Washington Nationals. Quackenbush was released by the Nationals organization on September 1, 2020.

Los Angeles Dodgers (second stint)
On May 1, 2021, Quackenbush signed a minor league contract with the Los Angeles Dodgers organization. He was assigned to the Triple-A Oklahoma City Dodgers to begin the season and was called up to the major leagues on August 7. He made his first MLB appearance in three years the following day, August 8, against the Los Angeles Angels. He struck out the first batter he faced before allowing two singles and a double and was removed from the game after only  of an inning. That was the only game he appeared in before he was designated for assignment by the Dodgers on August 12. He appeared in 45 games in AAA with a 1–7 record, 1.65 ERA and 23 saves. On October 8, Quackenbush elected free agency.

Toros de Tijuana
On January 16, 2022, Quackenbush signed with the Toros de Tijuana of the Mexican League for the 2022 season. He was released on July 14, 2022.

References

External links

1988 births
Living people
People from Land o' Lakes, Florida
Jesuit High School (Tampa) alumni
Baseball players from Florida
Major League Baseball pitchers
San Diego Padres players
Cincinnati Reds players
Los Angeles Dodgers players
South Florida Bulls baseball players
Eugene Emeralds players
Fort Wayne TinCaps players
Lake Elsinore Storm players
San Antonio Missions players
Tucson Padres players
Peoria Javelinas players
El Paso Chihuahuas players
Louisville Bats players
Oklahoma City Dodgers players
Naranjeros de Hermosillo players
American expatriate baseball players in Mexico
Toros de Tijuana players